The Kern River, previously Rio de San Felipe, later La Porciuncula, is an Endangered, Wild and Scenic river in the U.S. state of California, approximately  long. It drains an area of the southern Sierra Nevada mountains northeast of Bakersfield. Fed by snowmelt near Mount Whitney, the river passes through scenic canyons in the mountains and is a popular destination for whitewater rafting and kayaking. It is the southernmost major river system in the Sierra Nevada, and is the only major river in the Sierra that drains in a southerly direction.

The Kern River formerly emptied into the now dry Buena Vista Lake and Kern Lake via the Kern River Slough, and Kern Lake in turn  emptied into Buena Vista Lake via the Connecting Slough at the southern end of the Central Valley.  Buena Vista Lake, when overflowing, first backed up into Kern Lake and then upon rising higher drained into Tulare Lake via Buena Vista Slough and a changing series of sloughs of the Kern River.  The lakes were part of a partially endorheic basin that sometimes overflowed into the San Joaquin River. This basin also included the Kaweah and Tule Rivers, as well as southern distributaries of the Kings River that all flowed into Tulare Lake.

Since the late 19th century the Kern has been almost entirely diverted for irrigation, recharging aquifers, and the California Aqueduct, although some water empties into Lake Webb and Lake Evans, two small lakes in a portion of the former Buena Vista Lakebed. The lakes were created in 1973 for recreational use. The lakes hold  combined. Crops are grown in the rest of the former lakebed. In extremely wet years the river will reach the Tulare Lake basin through a series of sloughs and flood channels.

Despite its remote source, nearly all of the river is publicly accessible. The Kern River is particularly popular for wilderness hiking and whitewater rafting. The Upper Kern River is paralleled by trails to within a half-mile of its source (which lies at ). Even with the presence of Lake Isabella, the river is perennial down to the lower Tulare Basin. Its swift flow at low elevation makes the river below the reservoir an extremely popular location for rafting.

Course
The Kern begins in the Sierra Nevada in Sequoia National Park in northeastern Tulare County, near the border with Inyo County. The main branch of the river (sometimes called the North Fork Kern River) rises from several small lakes in a basin northwest of Mount Whitney. The headwaters are surrounded by the Great Western Divide to the west, the Kings-Kern Divide to the north and the main Sierra Crest to the east, all of which have multiple peaks above . The Kern River flows due south through a deep glacier-carved valley, passing through Inyo and Sequoia National Forests and the Golden Trout Wilderness, and receiving numerous tributaries including Rock Creek, Big Arroyo, Golden Trout Creek and Rattlesnake Creek. After deviating briefly from its due south course as it flows east around Hockett Peak, it is joined by the Little Kern River from the northwest at a site called Forks of the Kern. Below there, the Kern River continues south, and is joined by more tributaries including Peppermint Creek, South Creek, Brush Creek, and Salmon Creek, which all form large waterfalls as they tumble into the Kern River canyon.

At Kernville the river emerges from its narrow canyon into a wide valley where it is impounded in Lake Isabella, formed by Isabella Dam. The area was once known as Whiskey Flat, the former location of the town of Kernville. In Lake Isabella, it is joined by its largest tributary, the South Fork Kern River, which drains a high plateau area to the east of the North Fork drainage. The -long South Fork rises in Tulare County and flows south through Inyo National Forest, turning west after entering Kern County.

Below Isabella Dam the Kern River flows southwest in a rugged canyon along the south edge of the Greenhorn Mountains, parallel to SR 178. A number of hot springs are located along this section of the river. Due to upstream dam releases for irrigation and power generation, this part of the river has a swift flow even in the driest summers. The river then flows through a winding valley in the Sierra foothills before entering the San Joaquin Valley at Bakersfield, the largest city on the river. In Bakersfield proper, most of the river's flow is diverted into various canals for agricultural use in the southern San Joaquin Valley, and provide municipal water supplies to the City of Bakersfield and surrounding areas. Diverting the river's flow has left  of the riverbed that runs through Bakersfield dry. This fertile region is a large alluvial plain, or inland delta, formed by the Kern River, which once spread out into vast wetlands and seasonal lakes.

Historically, a  distributary of the Kern split off above Bakersfield and flowed south to what is now Arvin, where it formed the seasonal Kern Lake, which would grow to cover about  during wet periods. Water from Kern Lake would then flow west through Buena Vista Slough into Buena Vista Lake.

In periods of extremely high runoff, Buena Vista Lake overflowed and joined other wetlands and seasonal lakes in a series of sloughs that drained north into the former Tulare Lake, which would sometimes overflow into the San Joaquin River via Fresno Slough.

The Kern River is one of the very few rivers in the Central Valley which does not contribute water to the Central Valley Project (CVP). However, water from the CVP, mainly the Friant-Kern Canal, will be deposited for water storage in the aquifers.

History

The river was named by John C. Frémont in honor of Edward M. Kern in 1845 who, as the story goes, nearly drowned in the turbulent waters. Kern was the topographer of Fremont's third expedition through the American West. Before this, the Kern River was known as the "Rio de San Felipe" as named by Spanish missionary explorer Fr. Francisco Garcés when he explored the Bakersfield area on May 1, 1776. On August 2, 1806, Padre Zavidea renamed the river La Porciuncula for the day of the Porciuncula Indulgence. It was locally known as Po-sun-co-la until its renaming by Fremont.

Gold was discovered along the upper river in 1853. The snowmelt that fed the river resulted in periodic torrential flooding in Bakersfield until the construction of the Isabella Dam in the 1950s. These floods would periodically change the channel of the river. Since the establishment of Kern County in 1866 the main channel has flowed through what is the main part of downtown Bakersfield along Truxtun Avenue and again made a south turn along what is Old River Road. Many of the irrigation canals that flow in a southerly direction from the river follow the old channels of the Kern River, especially the canal that flows along Old River Road. The irrigated region of the Central Valley near the river supports the cultivation of alfalfa, carrots, fruit, and cotton, cattle grazing, and many other year-round crops. In 1987 the United States Congress designated  of the Kern's North (Main) Fork and South Fork as a National Wild and Scenic River.

The Great 1857 Fort Tejon earthquake on January 9, 1857, with an estimated magnitude of 7.9 on the San Andreas Fault was strong enough to temporarily switch the direction of the flow of the Kern River. Fish in the now dry Tulare Lake were left stranded on the shores.

The Buena Vista Lake basin is an arid area and the Kern River is the only significant water supply. Ongoing conflicts between urban and agricultural interests complicate management decisions, in recent years owing to the expiration of some long-term contractual agreements.

Exacerbating the problem, ongoing dam safety problems at Isabella Dam have led to reduced water storage there while repairs are made.

Lux v. Haggin - 1886 California Supreme Court case on water rights 
The Kern River was at the center of Lux v. Haggin, 69 Cal. 255; 10 P. 674; (1886), a historic case in the development of water rights in California, and also one of the most consequential water lawsuits in American history.

The overarching issue in Lux v. Haggin was whether the court would uphold English common law riparian rights (even though they were poorly suited to California's Mediterranean climate), institute the primacy of appropriative water rights, or create an entirely new system of water rights. The decision was important because it gave the court a chance to either continue to uphold English common law and riparian rights or give appropriative rights supremacy.

In the end, the court recognized both water rights systems but decided that appropriative rights were secondary to riparian rights. The ruling "created chaos by shackling the state with two fundamentally incompatible water allocation systems".

Additionally, the original definition of "reasonable" water use under English common law was changed. The court decided that water could be used for commercial and agricultural purposes as long as the use did not negatively affect other riparian landowners. This broadening of the "reasonable" use definition meant that riparian landowners could now use more water than previously allowed.

The subsequent 1888 Miller-Haggin Agreement that divides the water between First Point and Second Point users, still governs the use of Kern River water today.

National Wild And Scenic Rivers System designation

On November 24, 1987, The North and South Fork of the Kern River were designated as Wild & Scenic under the Wild & Scenic Rivers Act.  The Wild & Scenic designation covers  broken down as follows:  Wild — ; Scenic — ; Recreational — .

Endangered river status

The Lower Kern River was listed by American Rivers as one of America’s most endangered rivers of 2022. According to American Rivers, "decades of excessive water diversions for agriculture operations have dried up the last  of the Lower Kern River.".   Water right holders, use a series of canals, many that run right next to the dry riverbed, to divert water from the natural riverbed and in the process have allowed the Lower Kern River to run dry. Doing so has denied the 500,000 residents of the surrounding communities access to flowing river in direct violation of the public trust doctrine.  "Under the Public Trust Doctrine, California is obligated to protect flowing waterways for the benefit of current and future generations."

There are several local groups such as Bring Back the Kern, Kern River Fly Fishers, and The Kern River Parkway Foundation that are working to restore the Lower Kern River.

Ecology
The Kern River watershed is the native range of California's State Freshwater Fish, California golden trout (Oncorhynchus mykiss aguabonita), which are native to the Kern River tributaries South Fork Kern River and Golden Trout Creek, and the latter's tributary, Volcano Creek. Two currently recognized and closely related sibling subspecies. The Little Kern golden trout (O. m. whitei), found in the Little Kern River basin, and the Kern River rainbow trout (O. m. gilberti), are also found in the Kern River system. Together, these three trout form what is sometimes referred to as the "Golden Trout Complex".

In 2008, after public outcry, the City of Bakersfield and the California Department of Fish and Game (CDFG) decided to relocate a family of California Golden beaver (Castor canadensis subauratus) instead of killing them. California Golden beaver were native to the Central Valley and throughout the Sierra Nevada. Specifically to the Kern watershed, an oral history was taken from Roy De Voe, who claimed to have seen "very old beaver sign" on the east side of the Kern River at Funston Meadow (elevation ) in 1946. Also, Mr. De Voe reported that his friend Kenny Keelor trapped the Kern River for beaver around 1900, making his camp at the mouth of Rattlesnake Creek (elevation ) until they were trapped out completely by 1910 – 1914. The presence of Beaver Canyon Creek, tributary to the lower Kern River just east of Delonegha Hot Springs, is also consistent with the Kern River watershed having historically supported native beaver. This oral history is consistent with another oral history taken one watershed to the north by CDFG's Donald T. Tappe from a retired game warden in 1940, who stated that beaver were "apparently not uncommon on the upper part of the Kings River" until 1882–1883. Currently, there are large numbers of beaver in the Ramshaw Meadows on the South Fork Kern River where their dams are trapping sediment, forming extensive pools, accelerating meadow restoration, and increasing riparian willow habitat.

Kern River Hatchery 
Just north of Lake Isabella is the Kern River Hatchery. The Kern River Hatchery is also home to the Fishing and Natural History Museum, features picnic grounds and outdoor activities in the area.

Hatchery closure 
On December 1, 2020, after 3 years of extensive renovations, the hatchery was closed down by California Department of Fish and Wildlife, just 20 months after being reopened.   According to CDFW, the hatchery is closed for repairs with the primary focus on "replacement of a pipeline that is more than 50 years old and no longer adequately provides a reliable water supply for fish production". There is currently no date set for reopening the hatchery. Despite the closure of the hatchery, the hatchery still diverts 35 cfs year-round from the North Fork Kern River at the expense of North Fork Kern fishery and its biome.

Geology

The upper Kern River Canyon was created primarily as a result of tectonic forces, and not just by the erosional force of the river. The river's course has been modified several times throughout ancient geological history. Prior to 10 million years ago, the Kern River flowed into the San Joaquin Valley at a point further south, along what is now Walker Basin Creek, which outlets north of Arvin. Uplift west of the Kern Canyon Fault blocked the river and forced it to cut a new course further north, forming the steep gorge below Lake Isabella and Bakersfield. The upper part of the Kern River canyon, at least above Golden Trout Creek, was widened and deepened by glaciers during the Ice Ages. The Kern Canyon fault passes very close to Isabella Dam, and is considered a threat to the dam's structural stability.

The Kern River Oil Field is adjacent to the river on the north, just before the river flows into Bakersfield.  The large oil field, on low hills which rise gradually into the Sierra foothills, formerly allowed much of its wastewater to drain directly south into the river. However, modern environmental regulation ended this practice, and the contaminated water is now cleaned at water treatment plants and used to irrigate farms in the valley to the west.

Discharge

Due to water diversion and Isabella Dam the Kern River's discharge changes considerably over its length. The highest mean annual flows occur just downriver of Isabella Dam, but because the dam serves to regulate the flow of water the highest daily discharges occur above the dam on the North Fork section of the Kern River. In contrast the first stream gauge below Isabella Dam has recorded an average annual mean of  but a maximum daily discharge of only . Due to water withdrawals the three stream gauge stations below Isabella Dam show a dramatically decreasing discharge. At the last gauge, near Bakersfield, the river's average flow is only .

Recreation

Kern Canyon, the deep canyon of the river northeast of Bakersfield, is a popular location for fishing and boating, particularly fly fishing and whitewater rafting, whitewater kayaking, and riverboarding. Of particular interest to fishermen are the Kern River rainbow trout, the Little Kern golden trout, and the California golden trout. The Kern Canyon is  popular for camping, hiking, and picnicking. There are developed campgrounds maintained by the US Forest Service along the North Fork of the Kern River. Campgrounds include Camp 3, Fairview, Goldledge, Headquarters, Hospital Flat, and Limestone. All of the campgrounds are open in the summer months while only a few remain open year-round.

The Kern is well known for its danger, and is sometimes referred to as the "killer Kern". A sign at the mouth of Kern Canyon warns visitors: "Danger. Stay Out. Stay Alive" and tallies the deaths since 1968; as of May 26, 2021, the number of deaths listed is 317. Merle Haggard's song "Kern River" fictionally recounts such a tragedy.  Haggard's last song, "Kern River Blues", was  recorded two months prior to his death in 2016.

Below the canyon the Kern River has a gradient of 0.3% until it reaches the Kern River Oil Field and begins to meander along flat land into and through the city of Bakersfield. Tubing is popular along this stretch.

The Class II whitewater located in Kernville is used for the slalom event of the annual Kern River Festival.

In popular culture

Songs 
Kern River - 1985 song written by American country music singer Merle Haggard.

Kern River - 2022 song written by American Comedian and Songwriter Tim Heidecker in his album High School (2022). 

Kern River Blues - Also written by Merle Haggard, this was his last recording.

Art projects 
Flow - This joint art installation project was envisioned by Andres Amador, a Northern California artist and Bring Back the Kern on February 11, 2021. "Flow" used plant material collected by volunteers and then arranged in the dry riverbed near Beach Park to evoke the currents and eddies of a flowing river. According to the group, Bring Back the Kern, "the design seeks to highlight the irony of the riverbed being dry and raise the question of "why?"

A River Remembered - Miguel Rodriguez, a team member with Bring Back the Kern collecting photos, videos and stories of the once flowing river for an art exhibit.

The Mighty Kern River  - This 2021 children's book was written by Author Teresa Adamo and illustrator Jen Williams-Cordova "to raise awareness about Bakersfield’s mostly dry river and efforts to revive a more regular flow of water through town."

See also
 Indigenous peoples of California
 Tübatulabal (the Pahkanapil) of the Central Valley Yokuts
 Palagewan, who lived along the North Fork Kern River into Hot Springs Valley
 Bankalachi (the Toloim), who lived in the Greenhorn Mountains south to Poso Creek around Linns Valley and north to the Tule River
 Kawaiisu (the Nuwa), who lived in the Weldon Valley, the Kelso Valley, and Piute Mountains
 Yawelmani (the Yowlumne), who lived along the Kern River on the east side, north of Kern Lake

References

External links

Kern Valley River Council
Kern River Preserve
Kern River Parkway Foundation
Bring Back the Kern
Kern River Fly Fishers
Kern River Boaters
Kern River Conservancy

 
Rivers of Kern County, California
Rivers of Tulare County, California
Rivers of the Sierra Nevada (United States)
Geography of the San Joaquin Valley
Tributaries of the San Joaquin River
Wild and Scenic Rivers of the United States
Central Valley Project
Kern River Valley
Rivers of Northern California
Rivers of the Sierra Nevada in California